Barilius nelsoni is a freshwater fish in the family Cyprinidae. It is endemic to India and inhabits clear, gravelly streams. It grows to  TL. It might be a junior synonym of Barilius radiolatus. It is named in honour of Joseph S. Nelson, American ichthyologist.

References 

Nelsoni
Freshwater fish of India
Endemic fauna of India
Fish described in 1988